Thoothukudi Thermal Power Station is a power plant situated near newport of Thoothukudi in Tamil Nadu, India, on the sea shore of Bay of Bengal.

All the unit are coal based. Coal is transported by sea through ship from Haldia, Paradeep, Vizag Port to TTPS.
Coal transported by ship is given to crushers which crush the coal particles to 10-20mm in diameter. The crushed coal is fed to coal grinding mills with bowl roller via coal bunkers. The powdered coal is given to pulverisers and to furnace through forced draft fans. There are four mills around the furnace as well as oil injecting nozzles from oil storage for tangential firing.

References

External links

 http://www.infraline.com/power/State/Tamilnadu/TuticorinTPS.aspx
 http://www.tangedco.gov.in/linkpdf/tttps.pdf

Coal-fired power stations in Tamil Nadu
Thoothukudi district
1979 establishments in Tamil Nadu
Energy infrastructure completed in 1979
20th-century architecture in India